Cumilla Polytechnic Institute is a polytechnic institute in the city of Comilla, Bangladesh. It is one of the oldest and largest polytechnic institute in Bangladesh, and was established in 1962. This is the first government ICT based polytechnic institute for diploma engineering courses in the country.

History 
Cumilla Polytechnic Institute was established in 1962.

Directorates 
The institute operates under the executive control of the Ministry of Education(MOE) acting through the Directorate of Technical Education (DTE). The academic programmes and curricula are maintained under the regulation of the Bangladesh Technical Education Board (BTEB). BTEB function under Directorate of Inspection and Audit (DIA), which in turn function under Chief Accounts Office (CAO), and it function under Ministry of Education (Bangladesh).

Location 
Comilla Polytechnic Institute is located in Comilla Kotbari. To the north, Govt. Laboratory High School and Comilla Cantonment, Comilla University on the south, Shalban Buddhist Vihara, Mainamati Museum and Technical Teacher Training College (TCTC), Dhaka-Chittagong Highway before and Comilla Cadet College and BARD situated on the west.

Campus 
The main campus consists of two three-storey buildings, eight large workshop buildings. In front of main building has a Shaheed Minar, a beautiful fountain and a statue of the Bangabandhu Sheikh Mujibur Rahman on the left. Apart from separate lab workshops for each department, there are offices, libraries, laboratories and a 500-capacity auditorium. There is also a canteen, a school, a mosque, two ponds and a large playground, two boys and one girls hostel.

Academic departments 
Academic activities are undertaken by six departments

Academic Departments of Comilla Polytechnic Institute
 Civil Technology
 Electrical Technology
 Mechanical Technology
 Power Technology
 Electronics Technology
 Computer Technology

References

External links
Cumilla Polytechnic Institute
A list of all polytechnic institutes in Bangladesh

Polytechnic institutes in Bangladesh
Educational institutions established in 1962
1960s establishments in East Pakistan